Fanny Adele Watson (1873-1947) was an American painter and lithographer.

Watson was born on  April 30, 1873 in Toledo, Ohio. In 1880 her family moved to Pasadena, California after the death of her father. She studied at the Art Students League of New York as a young adult, and returned to California in 1917. She traveled to Paris and became a pupil of Raphael Collin and friends with poet/artist Khalil Gibran.She exhibited and was a member of the American Artists Professional League, the Pen and Brush Club, and the Society of Independent Artists. She also exhibited her work at the National Academy of Design. She was influenced by Symbolism and Mysticism.

Watson died in Pasadena, California, on March 23, 1947. In 1953 the Pasadena Art Institute held a retrospective of her work. Her work is in the collection of the Orange County Museum of Art.

References

External links
 

 
1873 births
1947 deaths
19th-century American women artists
20th-century American women artists
Artists from Toledo, Ohio
Art Students League of New York alumni